Too Young to Marry is a 1931 American Pre-Code comedy film directed by Mervyn LeRoy and starring Loretta Young and Grant Withers, a married couple in real life, although it ended with an annulment. It was produced and distributed by First National Pictures. It is based on a 1929 play Broken Dishes by Martin Flavin.

It is preserved in the Library of Congress collection incomplete.

Cast
Loretta Young - Elaine Bumpsted
Grant Withers - Bill Clark
O. P. Heggie - Cyrus Bumpsted
J. Farrell MacDonald - Dr. Horace Virgil Stump
Richard Tucker - Chester Armstrong
Emma Dunn - Jennie Bumpsted
Aileen Carlyle - Mabel Bumpsted

References

External links
Too Young to Marry at IMDb.com

1931 films
Films directed by Mervyn LeRoy
American films based on plays
First National Pictures films
1931 comedy films
American comedy films
1930s English-language films
1930s American films
Films with screenplays by Francis Edward Faragoh